The FN Ballista is a sniper rifle developed by FN Herstal. The company states that the Ballista's design compares with the Remington MSR, the Sako TRG M10, the Armalite AR-30, and the Accuracy International AWM. The Remington MSR was selected as the winner of the US Military PSR competition.

Design
The Ballista is a modular, air-cooled, magazine-fed, manually operated, bolt-action sniper rifle that is multi-caliber capable. It comes standard equipped with several MIL-STD 1913 rails located at both the 6 and 12 o'clock positions of the rifle in order to mount various attachments that will fit the operator's needs. Additional rails are also available as optional accessories. The Ballista features a fully adjustable, side-folding stock that can be outfitted with a monopod as well.

References

External links 
 
 FNH Firearms Blog

.338 firearms
FN Herstal firearms
Bolt-action rifles of Belgium
Sniper rifles of Belgium